Aubignas is a commune in the Ardèche department in  the Auvergne-Rhône-Alpes region of southern France.

The inhabitants of the commune are known as Aubignassiens or Aubignassiennes.

Geography
Aubignas is located some 10 km west by north-west of Montelimar, 6 km north-west of Le Teil and 16 km south of Privas. Access to the commune is by Route nationale N102 from Le Teil in the south-east which passes through the south of the commune forming part of the southern border and continues west to Saint-Jean-le-Centenier. Access to the village in the centre of the commune is by the Champagnet road which goes north from the N102. Apart from the village there is the hamlet of Pignatelle in the south The commune is forested in the north with farmland in the south.

The Frayol rises in the north of the commune and flows south-east gathering many tributaries and continuing to join the Rhone at Le Teil. The Ruisseau des Avents forms the eastern border of the commune as it flows south to join the Frayol as it leaves the commune. The Ruisseau de l'Eguille rises in the north-west of the commune and flows south to join the Escoutay at Alba-la-Romaine.

Neighbouring communes and villages

Heraldry

Administration

List of Successive Mayors

Demography
In 2017 the commune had 469 inhabitants.

Distribution of Age Groups
The population of the town is relatively young compared to the departmental average.

Percentage Distribution of Age Groups in Aubignas and Ardèche Department in 2017

Source: INSEE

Culture and heritage

Civil heritage
The commune has many houses and farmhouses that are registered as historical monuments:

The 10th House (19th century)
The 11th House (15th century)
The 12th House (19th century)
The 13th House (19th century)
The Mas du Bouchet Farmhouse at le Bouchet (13th century)
The 1st Farmhouse (1841)
The Domain of Colombier Farmhouse (15th century)
The 1st House (17th century)
The 2nd Farmhouse at le Bouchet (16th century)
The 2nd Farmhouse at Aunas (1844)
The 2nd Farmhouse at le Colombier (16th century)
The 2nd House (1711)
The 3rd House (17th century)
The 4th House (18th century)
The 5th House (1802)
The 6th House (17th century)
The 7th House (17th century)
The 8th House (1796)
The 9th House (1843)
Largelas Bridge (19th century)
A Fortified Chateau (12th century)
Houses (16th-19th centuries)
A Farmhouse at les Combes (1825)
A Farmhouse (1847)
A House called a Chateau (16th century)
A Farmhouse at la Mure (1648)
A Farmhouse at Liotard (16th century)
Farmhouses (13th-20th centuries)
A Farmhouse at Rabayas (16th century)
A Farmhouse at Fongiraud (18th century)
A Farmhouse at Pignatelle (1840)
TheMas de Cantonne Farmhouse (18th century)
TheMas de l'Aiguille Farmhouse (16th century)
A Farmhouse at le Clos (1857)
A Farmhouse at la Grangette (16th century)
A Farmhouse at Chazelles (1834)
A Farmhouse at Peyrolle (15th century)
A Farmhouse at la Fare (1840)
A Farmhouse at Chante duc (16th century)
A Flour Mill at la Mure (15th century)
A Fountain (18th century)
The Town Fortification (11th century)
The Village (11th century)

The Town Hall and School (1888). The town hall contains an item that is registered as a historical object:
A Relief: Christ on the Cross (15th century)

Religious heritage
The commune has a church and some structures that are registered as historical monuments:
A Wayside Cross at Liotard (19th century)
An Oratory Chapelette
The Church of the Assumption(11th century)
A 'Cemetery Cross (19th century)
A Monumental Cross'' (19th century)

The Church contains many items that are registered as historical objects:
A Statue: Saint Regis (19th century)
A Statue: Saint Diacre (19th century)
A Statue: Saint Joseph (19th century)
A Statue: Virgin and Child (19th century)
The Marie Françoise Léon Bell (1946)
A Statue: Saint Joseph (18th century)
A Statue: Saint François Régis (18th century)
A Statue: Saint Vincent (18th century)
A Statue: Virgin and Child (18th century)
A Monumental Cross: Christ on the Cross (19th century)

Notable people linked to the communePlacide Astier''' was born in the commune on 23 February 1856 and died in Paris on 6 March |1918. He was a scientist and French politician.

See also
Communes of the Ardèche department

References

External links

Aubignas on Géoportail, National Geographic Institute (IGN) website 
Aubignas on the 1750 Cassini Map

Communes of Ardèche